The longtail dragonet (Callionymus gardineri) is a species of dragonet native to the western Indian Ocean. This species grows to a length of  TL. The specific name honours the British zoologist John Stanley Gardiner (1872-1946).

References 

G
Fish described in 1908